Utah Division may refer to:
Utah Division (D&RGW) of the Denver and Rio Grande Western Railroad, now Union Pacific
Utah Division of Air Quality
Utah Division of Arts and Museums
Utah Division of Occupational & Professional Licensing
Utah Division of Parks and Recreation
Utah Division of Real Estate
Utah Division of Water Quality
Utah Division of Wildlife Resources